Buckle Up may refer to:

Buckle Up Music Festival three-day country music festival in Cincinnati
"Buckle Up", song by Debbie Harry from Rockbird
"Buckle Up", song by Pearl Jam from Gigaton